Riverhead Raceway is a quarter-mile (402 m) oval race track with a Figure 8 course, located in  Riverhead, New York. It is the only auto racing venue on Long Island since Westhampton Raceway closed down in 2003. It started being built in 1949 and opened as a dirt track in 1951, before permanently changing to asphalt in 1955. The raceway was also well known for featuring a towering statue of a Native American, dubbed "Chief Running Fair", at its entrance until it was destroyed in 2012 due to Hurricane Sandy but rebuilt by Christmas and still standing at its original location.

Events
Riverhead Raceway has seven racing divisions: Modified, Riverhead Modified Crate Figure Eight, Late Model, Blunderbust, Super Pro Truck, and Legends. It hosts races for the Whelen Modified Tour, Whelen All-American Series, and the Northeastern Midget Association. Other events include demolition derby, school bus racing, monster trucks, enduro, one-on-one spectator drags and go-karts up until the fall of 2016.

The track's signature race is the non-champion Islip 300, named for the now-defunct speedway on Long Island, which began in 2016.  The open competition event allows cars run to any of four different series ("Tour Type" modifieds)  specifications.

Drivers
Notable drivers who used to race at Riverhead Raceway include Steve Park and his uncle Bill Park, Greg Sacks, Charlie Jarzombek, Brett Bodine, Tom Baldwin, Donny Lia, and 2013 NASCAR Whelen Modified Tour champion Ryan Preece.

Riverhead Raceway modified champions

Cultural references 
Riverhead Raceway was featured as a filming location in the HBO series The Sopranos under the name "Chikamauga Raceway". It appears in Season 5, Episode 7 - "In Camelot".

See also
List of auto racing tracks in the United States
Short track motor racing
Track also in the documentary "The last race"

References

External links
Official site
Riverhead Raceway race results at Racing-Reference

Sports venues in Long Island
Riverhead (town), New York
Motorsport venues in New York (state)
Sports venues in Suffolk County, New York
1951 establishments in New York (state)
Sports venues completed in 1951
NASCAR tracks